The 2006 NRL season was the 99th season of professional rugby league football in Australia and the ninth run by the National Rugby League. The lineup of teams remained unchanged from the previous year, with fifteen clubs competing for the 2006 Telstra Premiership. Throughout the 26 rounds of the regular season ten teams from New South Wales (9 of them from the Sydney basin), two from Queensland and one each from Victoria, the ACT and New Zealand competed for the minor premiership. Eight of these teams qualified for the four-week finals series, with the Brisbane Broncos eventual victors over the Melbourne Storm in the grand final. Melbourne finished the regular season first so were awarded the minor premiership, but this was later revoked due to the Melbourne Storm salary cap breach.

Pre season
Newcastle Knights coach Michael Hagan signed a three-year deal to coach the Parramatta Eels, beginning in 2007. Hagan replaced Brian Smith, who had coached the Eels since 1997 whilst Smith replaced Hagan at Newcastle in an unprecedented coach-swap. In other coaching moves, Matthew Elliott was confirmed as the coach of the Penrith Panthers, beginning in 2007.
Penrith Panthers halfback Craig Gower was fired as captain, suspended for four games and fined $100,000 ($90,000 to be paid to an NRL programme encouraging the responsible use of alcohol by league players and $10,000 to replace a destroyed golf cart) after a string of alcohol-fueled incidents at a charity golf function.
The Charity Shield heralded the unofficial start of the season, with the South Sydney Rabbitohs defeating St George Illawarra 14-12 in their first home game at Telstra Stadium on February 18. All NRL clubs engaged in a series of trials during the month of February.
Wests Tigers premiership-winning captain Scott Prince announced on March 3 he had signed a four-year deal with expansion team Gold Coast Titans, beginning in 2007. Prince relinquished the captaincy of the Tigers for the 2006 season.

New Zealand Warriors salary cap breach
The salary cap for the 2006 season was A$3.366 million per club for their 25 highest-paid players. The New Zealand Warriors were investigated by the National Rugby League over alleged salary cap breaches committed by the team's previous administrators. The club admitted to inflating its salary cap to the tune of nearly $1 million during the 2005 season. The National Rugby League fined the Warriors $430,000 and ordered the team to start the season with a four premiership point deficit. It was the first time in 99 years of rugby league in Australia that a team has started a season on less than zero premiership points.

The Warriors appealed the decision by the NRL to deduct the four competition points but accepted the financial penalty. Prior to the beginning of the season, the National Rugby League confirmed that the points penalty would stand. The penalty would prove the decisive factor in the Warriors missing the finals for the third year in succession.

Teams

Season summary

The season began on March 10 with a match between defending premiers Wests Tigers and the St George Illawarra Dragons, played at Telstra Stadium. The Melbourne Storm won 20 out of 24 regular season matches to win the minor premiership eight points clear of the Bulldogs. However, in April 2010, the Storm were retroactively stripped of their minor premiership as a result of salary cap breaches occurring over the course of the 2006, 2007, 2008, 2009 and 2010 seasons.

The grand finals:

  Brisbane Broncos vs  Melbourne Storm (NRL)
  Parramatta Eels vs  Newtown Jets (NSW Cup)
  Penrith Panthers vs  Newcastle Knights (NSW Jersey Flegg Cup)

The winners in all grades were:

  Brisbane Broncos (NRL)
  Parramatta Eels (NSW Cup)
  Penrith Panthers (NSW Jersey Flegg Cup)

The test match

  Australia vs  New Zealand

The tri-nations Series

  Australia vs  New Zealand
  Australia vs  Great Britain
  Great Britain vs  New Zealand

The State Of Origin Series

  Queensland vs  New South Wales

Venues
Sixteen stadiums regularly hosted National Rugby league matches, with a further six hosting  at least one match in season 2006.

Advertising
In 2006 the NRL and their advertising agency MJW Hakuhodo stayed with the Hoodoo Gurus' "That's My Team"  soundtrack for a fourth year, producing a treatment aimed to appeal to the fundamental hope of all players and fans: that it would be ‘their team’ who would win the Grand Final.

Capitalising on the enthusiasm generated by the Wests Tigers triumph of 2005 in only their sixth season, the campaign line and song chorus was changed to ‘That’s My Dream’.

All fifteen NRL club captains featured heavily in the television and outdoor ads holding aloft the Telstra trophy. Eight young real life fans also featured in the TV commercial reflecting the origins of the game from backyard football scenes to Sydney beaches. Each was a fan of one of eight clubs who had not till then won the Telstra Premiership trophy and four different broadcast versions of the ad told the stories of their love of the game and each's dream of their own team's victory.

Dally M Awards

The Dally M Awards were introduced in 1980 by News Limited. The most prestigious of these awards is the Dally M Medal which is awarded to the Player Of The Year. The other prestigious award is the Provans Summons Medal which is the season's best player as voted by the public. As well as honouring the player of the year the awards night also recognises the premier player in each position, the best coach, the best captain, representative player of the year and the most outstanding rookie of the season. The awards night and Player of the Year medal are named in honour of Australian former rugby league great Herbert Henry "Dally" Messenger.

Team of the Year

Statistics and Records
Clinton Schifcofske ran 3,741 metres with the ball in 2006, more than any other player in the competition.
The Brisbane Broncos set a club record for their biggest comeback win when they came from 18-0 down at half time to win 30-28 against Canberra Raiders in round 8.
The Melbourne Storm set a club record for their longest winning streak with 11 games from Round 12 to Round 23.
New Zealand Warriors defeated South Sydney Rabbitohs 66–0 in Round 16. This set new records for New Zealand's greatest winning margin and South Sydney's greatest losing margin.
The Newcastle Knights and Canberra Raiders set the league record for the highest aggregate score in a match, with a total of 102 points scored in Newcastle's 70–32 win in Round 2. The previous record (97 points, between St George and Canterbury-Bankstown) had stood since 1935.
The Cronulla-Sutherland Sharks set a then-club record for longest losing streak with 10 matches from Round 17 to Round 26.
Nathan Merritt became the first player to top the try scoring chart from the wooden spoon winning side.

Ladder

Finals series
The Melbourne Storm went into the finals for the first time as Minor Premiers. They had a week off after their first finals win against the Parramatta Eels 12-6 to prepare for a preliminary final encounter, again the St. George Illawarra Dragons which was won by the Storm 24-10, earning them a spot in the Grand final against the Brisbane Broncos. The Broncos had surprised everyone in the previous two months. After a slight hiccup in the qualifying Final, going down against St. George Illawarra Dragons 20-4, they came back in the next two weeks, beating the Newcastle Knights 50-6 in the Semi-final and coming from 20-6 down at halftime to win 37-20 against the Bulldogs in the preliminary final.

Finals Chart

Grand Final

Player statistics
The following statistics are as of the conclusion of Round 26.

Top 5 point scorers

Top 5 try scorers

Top 5 goal scorers

2006 Transfers

Players

See also
 2006 State of Origin series
 2006 Rugby League Tri-Nations
 Rugby league in 2006
 2006 Australian football code crowds

Footnotes

External links
2006 NRL season at stats.rleague.com
2006 NRL season at rugbyleagueproject.com
2006 NRL season at abc.net.au
 2006 NRL season at nrl.com
Key features of the 2006 Telstra Premiership - article at menofleague.com